Caroline Weber (born 31 May 1986 in Dornbirn) is a retired Austrian rhythmic gymnast.

Career 

Weber competed at the 2008 Summer Olympics in Beijing, China, she placed 17th in qualifications and did not advance to the finals. In 2009, she earned the bronze medal on hoop at the 2009 Bourgas Grand Prix.

She had her highest placement at the 2011 World Championships finishing 15th in the All-around. She competed in the individual all-around event at the 2012 Summer Olympics, where she placed 18th in qualifications.

She competed in her 11th European in a home crowd in Vienna, Austria at the 2013 European Championships. performing a gala after the competition where she also completed her competitive career.

References

External links
 
 
 

1986 births
Living people
Austrian rhythmic gymnasts
Olympic gymnasts of Austria
Gymnasts at the 2008 Summer Olympics
Gymnasts at the 2012 Summer Olympics
People from Dornbirn
Sportspeople from Vorarlberg